Anass Ahannach (born 7 February 1998) is a Moroccan professional footballer who plays as a midfielder for Den Bosch.

Club career
Ahannach made his Eerste Divisie debut for Almere City FC on 15 September 2017 in a game against FC Dordrecht.

On 13 June 2022, Ahannach signed a two-year contract with Almere City.

International career
Ahannach was born in the Netherlands and is of Moroccan descent. He debuted for the Morocco national under-23 football team in a 1–1 friendly tie with the Tunisia U23s on 9 September 2018.

Personal life
His cousin Soufyan Ahannach is also a footballer. Soufyan's brother (and Anass's cousin) Alami Ahannach is a football coach and a former Moroccan international footballer.

References

External links
 
 
 Career stats & Profile - Voetbal International

Living people
1998 births
Footballers from Amsterdam
Moroccan footballers
Morocco youth international footballers
Dutch footballers
Dutch sportspeople of Moroccan descent
Association football midfielders
Almere City FC players
FC Den Bosch players
Eerste Divisie players
Tweede Divisie players
Derde Divisie players